Svetlana Mikhailovna Pasti (until 2003: Juskevits ) is a senior researcher at the Centre for Journalism, Media and Communication at the University of Tampere. She has been serving as a docent in journalism since 2013. Svetlana Pasti specialises in Russian media, generations in journalism, and professional culture of journalists. She obtained a licentiate's degree and then a Ph.D. from the University of Tampere in 2002 and 2007, respectively. For her doctorate, she performed research in the changing profession of the journalist in Russia. She is considered a very good expert on the media of Russia because she had been working for 14 years in the  before she moved to Finland in 1996. Svetlana Pasti is of Russian origin.

References

External links
 

Russian journalists
Living people
Finnish people of Russian descent
Year of birth missing (living people)